The pearly–bellied seedeater (Sporophila pileata) is a species of bird in the family Thraupidae.  It was lumped with the copper seedeater, (S. bouvreuil) and known together as the capped seedeater before being split in February 2012.

It is found in southern Brazil, Paraguay, northern Uruguay and northeastern Argentina. Its natural habitat is dry savanna.

All capuchinos (as they are known in Spanish), including the pearly-bellied seedeater, are experiencing severe population declines due to illegal trapping for pet trade and loss of natural habitats, as a result of grasslands being used for agricultural uses.

References
 
Freitas M., Medolago C., Costa M., et al. (2018). First description of nests, eggs, and nestlings of the Pearly-bellied Seedeater ( Sporophila pileata ). The Wilson Journal of Ornithology., 130(3), 823–828. 
Machado, E. & Silveira, L.F. (2010) Geographical and seasonal distribution of the Seedeaters Sporophila bouvreuil and Sporophila pileata (Aves: Emberizidae). Papéis Avulsos de Zoologia, 50 (32):517-533. 
Machado, E. & Silveira, L.F. (2011) Plumage variability and taxonomy of the Capped Seedeater Sporophila bouvreuil (Aves: Passeriformes: Emberizidae). Zootaxa, 2781: 49–62.
Sclater, P.L. (1864) Descriptions of seven new species of birds discovered by the late Dr. John Natterer in Brazil. Proceedings of the Zoological Society of London, 607 pp.
Turbek S., Giacomo A., Browne M., Pasian C. (2019). First nest description of the Iberá Seedeater (Sporophila iberaensis). The Wilson Journal of Ornithology., 131(1), 156–160. 

Specific

pearly-bellied seedeater
Birds of Brazil
Birds of Paraguay
pearly-bellied seedeater
pearly-bellied seedeater